Laurie Walsh (born 16 February 1948) is  a former Australian rules footballer who played with Footscray in the Victorian Football League (VFL). Jumper number 41.

Notes

External links 		
		
		
		
		
		
		
Living people		
1948 births		
		
Australian rules footballers from Victoria (Australia)		
Western Bulldogs players